Otto Emil Franz Ulrich Busse (6 December 1867 – 3 February 1922) was a German pathologist. Busse was born in Gühlitz, Prignitz, Germany.

He studied medicine at the University of Greifswald, and subsequently became an assistant to Paul Grawitz (1850–1932), (his future father-in-law) at Greifswald. Afterwards he moved to Posen (today Poznań, Poland), where in 1904 he became a professor of pathology. From 1911 until 1922 he was professor of pathological anatomy at the University of Zurich, where he died.

In 1894 Busse was the first to provide a written account of cryptococcosis, caused by a yeast-like fungus now known as Cryptococcus neoformans. This he discovered in a patient with chronic periostitis of the tibia. At the time he called the fungus Saccharomyces hominis. During the same time period, Francesco Sanfelice cultured the yeast-like fungus from peach juice, naming the fungus Saccharomyces neoformans. Infection caused by the fungus has also been referred to as "Busse-Buschke disease", named in conjunction with dermatologist Abraham Buschke (1868–1943).

See also
Hanns von Meyenburg

References 
 NCBI One hundred years of cryptococcosis. Medical mycology in the 19th century in Greifswald
 PrignitzLexikon (translated biography of Otto Busse) 
 Busse-Buschke disease @ Who Named It

German pathologists
1867 births
1922 deaths
People from Białogard
University of Greifswald alumni
Academic staff of the University of Greifswald
Academic staff of the University of Zurich
People from the Province of Brandenburg
20th-century German physicians
20th-century German scientists